Spilosoma ignivagans is a moth in the  family Erebidae. It was described by Rothschild in 1919. It is found in China (Yunnan).

Description
Male

Very closely allied to erythrophleps, Hmpsn., but with less red on fore wings and fewer pale markings on hind wings. Antennae black, pectus and legs sooty-slate, frons and vertex rufous-orange; thorax rufous-orange, with a sooty dot on teguloe and sooty streaks on patagia; abdomen above rufous-orange ringed with sooty black, below white. Fore wing slate-brown with orange-scarlet nervures; three ill-defined orange-scarlet patches on basal half of costa; two rufous-orange spots in cell and one beyond ; four irregular bands of rufous-orange below median to inner margin, much angled, waved, excised, and partially joined. Hind wings sooty slate-grey, with white veins; a broken irregular post-median band, broader between vein 2 and abdominal margin; some white spots at end of veins.
Length of fore wing 26 mm. ; expanse 56.5 mm.
Hab. Tali, Yunnan.

References

Natural History Museum Lepidoptera generic names catalog

Moths described in 1919
ignivagans